James V. Barnett II is an American engineer and co-founder of the FPGA developer Xilinx.

Education
Barnett earned a BS degree in Ceramic Engineering from the University of Illinois in 1967. His early career was spent at Fairchild Semiconductor, Raytheon Semiconductor, American Microsystems, Ness Time, and Zilog Semiconductor.

Founding of Xilinx
Barnett co-founded Xilinx with Ross Freeman and Bernard Vonderschmitt in 1984. The three individuals had been working together at Zilog where Freeman wished to develop chips that were blank and users could program the logic themselves and envisioned the field-programmable gate array. Zilog executives were not interested in developing this technology, which prompted the three Zilog engineers to leave the company and pursue the concept independently. They raised $4.25 million in venture capital from Hambrecht & Quist and Kleiner Perkins Caufield and Byers, among others, to form Xilinx, Inc., in 1984.

Legacy
Barnett was inducted into the University of Illinois College of Engineering Hall of Fame in 2012

References

Year of birth missing (living people)
Living people
20th-century American engineers
21st-century American engineers
Grainger College of Engineering alumni
American technology company founders